The China Human Rights Biweekly, also known as Zhongguo Renquan Shuangzhoukan or Chinese Human Rights Biweekly or China's Human Rights Biweekly, generally known as Human Rights in China Biweekly, abbreviated as HRIC Biweekly, is a United States-based Chinese online magazine founded and owned by the non-governmental organization "Human Rights in China". It was officially inaugurated on 1 June 2009. As of January 30, 2020, the magazine will no longer been updated.

Human Rights in China Biweekly is a newsletter of news and opinions that are banned and censored in the Mainland China. Since its founding, the magazine has been repeatedly paralysed by cyberattacks made by hackers from Mainland China. The mission of the HRIC Biweekly is to "advocate for the progress of human rights in China" (为中国的人权进步呐喊). The journal is one of the main platforms for overseas Chinese liberal intellectuals (中国自由知识分子) to speak out and is also the mainstream media of the overseas pro-democracy movement.

History
The first issue of Human Rights in China Biweekly was published on 1 June 2009, as a result of the merger of the former monthly magazine Human Beings and Human Rights (人与人权) and the weekly magazine Huaxia Electronics Post (华夏电子报).

No longer updated
As of November 29, 2020, the website of Human Rights in China Biweekly is still accessible, but the magazine is no longer updated.

References

Online magazines published in the United States
Magazines established in 2009
Magazines published in New York City
Biweekly magazines published in the United States
Human rights in China
China–United States relations
Defunct political magazines published in the United States
Magazines disestablished in 2020